Andráshida Sport Club is a professional football club based in Andráshida, Zalaegerszeg, Hungary, that competes in the Nemzeti Bajnokság III, the third tier of Hungarian football.

History
Andráshida were eliminated from the round of 16 of the 2018–19 Magyar Kupa by Soroksár on 2–4 aggregate.

Honours

Domestic
Nemzeti Bajnokság III:
Runner-up (1): 2012–13

External links
 Profile on Magyar Futball

References

Football clubs in Hungary
Association football clubs established in 1952
1952 establishments in Hungary